The LNER Class Y3 was a class of 0-4-0 geared steam locomotives built by Sentinel Waggon Works for the London and North Eastern Railway and introduced in 1927. They passed into British Railways ownership in 1948 and were numbered 68154-68185. At least one was based at Immingham in 1950.

Power unit 
The superheated vertical water-tube boiler and the engine were similar to those used in Sentinel steam wagons. The engines had poppet valves and reversing was by sliding camshaft. The advantage of the water-tube boiler was that steam could be raised much more quickly than with a conventional fire-tube boiler.

Transmission
Final drive to the wheels was by sprocket chain. Some locomotives had a sprocket gear ratio of 19:19 and others 15:19. In addition, there was a two-speed gearbox but gears could only be changed while the locomotive was stationary. Tractive effort was:
 Ratio 19:19, Low gear , High gear  (68154-68179 and 68184-68185)
 Ratio 15:19, Low gear , High gear  (68180-68183)

References

Sources

External links
 LNER encyclopedia

Sentinel locomotives
Y03
0-4-0T locomotives
Railway locomotives introduced in 1927
Scrapped locomotives
Standard gauge steam locomotives of Great Britain
Shunting locomotives